Marika Popowicz-Drapała (born 28 April 1988) is a Polish track and field athlete who specialises in sprinting. She is a two-time European bronze medalist in the 4 x 100 metres relay.

Personal life 
Popowicz-Drapała was born 28 April 1988 in Gniezno, Poland. She is married to a former sprinter, Radosław Drapała.

Career

2005 to 2008 
Popowicz-Drapała made her first major appearances in 2005, finishing in sixth place in the 200 metres at the 2005 World Youth Championships in Athletics and helping the Polish women's 4×100 metres relay team to a gold medal at the 2005 European Athletics Junior Championships. She became the Polish junior champion in the 100 metres and 200 m in 2006 and went on to reach the semi-finals of both events at the 2006 World Junior Championships in Athletics in Beijing. She attended the 2007 European Athletics Junior Championships and formed part of the relay team which won the bronze medal. She was selected as a back-up runner for the 2007 World Championships in Athletics, but ultimately did not compete.

2009 
Popowicz-Drapała won senior medals for the first time in 2009 at an International Military Sports Council competition: she won the bronze in the 100 m and silver in the 200 m behind Marta Jeschke at the 2009 World Military Track and Field Championship . Representing Poland at the 2009 European Team Championships, she finished fifth overall in the 100 m. She won a relay silver medal with the Polish team at the 2009 Summer Universiade and repeated the feat at the 2009 European Athletics U23 Championships (where she also won bronze medals in the 100 and 200 m events). She was selected for the 100 metres at the 2009 World Championships in Athletics, but did not start.

2010 
At the start of 2010, Popowicz-Drapała took part in the women's 60 metres at the 2010 IAAF World Indoor Championships but was eliminated in the heats stage. She helped promote the 2010 IAAF World Cross Country Championships in Bydgoszcz by taking part in a pre-championship cross country race. She won the bronze medal with the Polish 4 x 100 metres relay at the 2010 European Athletics Championships breaking the Polish national record.

Olympic career 
She was part of Poland's 4 x 100 m team at the 2012 Summer Olympics.  At the 2016 Summer Olympics, she competed in the 100 m individual.

Personal bests

All information taken from IAAF profile.

International competitions

References

External links

1988 births
Living people
People from Gniezno
Polish female sprinters
Athletes (track and field) at the 2012 Summer Olympics
Athletes (track and field) at the 2016 Summer Olympics
Athletes (track and field) at the 2020 Summer Olympics
Olympic athletes of Poland
European Athletics Championships medalists
Sportspeople from Greater Poland Voivodeship
Universiade medalists in athletics (track and field)
Zawisza Bydgoszcz athletes
Universiade silver medalists for Poland
Universiade bronze medalists for Poland
Olympic female sprinters
20th-century Polish women
21st-century Polish women